The Luang Prabang Film Festival (LPFF) is a non-profit organization that provides a platform for showcasing Southeast Asia’s film industry.

LPFF hosts a yearly film festival in Luang Prabang, Laos, which features works solely from ASEAN-member countries. Additionally, the organization supports various educational activities, competitions and small grants for filmmakers from Laos and the greater Southeast Asian region throughout the year.

Background 
The Luang Prabang Film Festival was founded as a non-profit cultural organization in 2010 by Gabriel Kuperman. The organization’s mission is to “celebrate filmmaking and promote cultural exchange in Southeast Asia, while supporting a sustainable local industry and art form.” 

The Luang Prabang Film Festival is held annually in the UNESCO World Heritage town of Luang Prabang, Laos. The film festival showcases feature films of all genres from ASEAN-member countries (Brunei, Cambodia, Indonesia, Laos, Malaysia, Myanmar, the Philippines, Singapore, Thailand, and Vietnam).

Since its inaugural year in 2010, Luang Prabang Film Festival has been a leading platform for showcasing innovative Southeast Asian cinema, attracting over 2,000 attendees to each night-time screening. The festival is held over one week each December; all of its screenings are free and open to the public.

The festival generally screens art-house films in the afternoon at Sofitel Luang Prabang. LPFF screens its night programming, geared towards the local Lao audience, at Luang Prabang's Handicraft Market square.  LPFF's Motion Picture Ambassadors––a team of film experts from ASEAN-member countries–– propose the programming for the festival each year.

Educational activities 
LPFF hosts a variety of educational workshops and activities, aimed at developing storytelling, filmmaking and production skills within the regional Lao and greater Southeast Asian communities.

The organization facilitates Lao Filmmakers Fund, the country’s only publicly generated grant program for filmmakers. Support for the grant comes from Oxfam International.

MEKONG 2030 project 
LPFF produced a cross-border film anthology and has invited filmmakers from the five Southeast Asian Mekong-region countries to envision the future of the mekong river and its dependent communities in the year 2030. The anthology is co-directed by Kulikar Sotho (from Cambodia), Anysay Keola (from Laos), Sai Naw Kham (from Myanmar), Anocha Suwichakornpong (from Thailand), and Pham Ngoc Lan (from Vietnam).

Past events  

The following is a list of the programming for various past events:

2017

2016

2015

2014

2013

2012

2011

2010

Awards 
A notable feature of the festival is its "Talent Lab" for emerging Southeast Asian filmmakers, which is held in collaboration with Tribeca Film Institute. Talent Lab has been active since 2016. At the end of each Talent Lab, a jury selects a winning project to participate in the TFI Network Market.

Additionally, during each Talent Lab, Aurora Media Holdings selects one project to receive a $10,000 cash investment towards the completion of the film. In 2018, Indochina Productions created a "Rising Star" award to be handed out to a participating project.

In 2015, the festival instituted an audience award, which has been active ever since.

Recipients

See also
Cinema of Laos

References

External links
Official Website

Film festivals in Asia
Festivals in Laos
Organizations based in Laos
Cinema of Laos